These are the Billboard Hot 100 number-one singles of 1969.

That year, 8 acts hit number one for the first time, such as Sly & the Family Stone, The 5th Dimension, Billy Preston, Henry Mancini, Zager and Evans, The Archies, Steam, and Peter, Paul and Mary. The Beatles and The 5th Dimension were the only acts to have more than one song hit number one, with each having two.

Chart history

Number-one artists

See also
1969 in music
List of Billboard number-one singles
Cashbox Top 100 number-one singles of 1969

Sources
Fred Bronson's Billboard Book of Number 1 Hits, 5th Edition
Joel Whitburn's Top Pop Singles 1955-2008, 12 Edition
Joel Whitburn Presents the Billboard Hot 100 Charts: The Sixties
Additional information obtained can be verified within Billboard's online archive services and print editions of the magazine.

References

1969 record charts
1969